Celebrity Coach Trip 2 was the second celebrity series of Coach Trip which aired from 10–21 October 2011. The series featured a variety of celebrity couples on a 10-day tour, the couples get to vote off the other couples that they do not get along with. On the last day of the coach trip the remaining couples vote for the couple that they want to win the £1000 prize for charity. This coach trip had a journey around the Mediterranean, with the starting location and pick up point in Paris, France, and the first destination was Monaco.

Voting System
The Voting system on this series was:
  Days 1 to 5 was a yellow card
  Days 6 to 9 an automatic red card

Contestants

Celebrity Voting History
 Indicates that the couple received the most votes and received a yellow card
 Indicates that the couple received the most votes and were red carded off the trip
 Indicates that it was the couple's first vote meaning they could not be voted for
 Indicates that the couple were voted as the most popular couple and won series
 Indicates that the couple were voted as the second most popular couple
 Indicates that the couple were voted as the third most popular couple

The trip by day

Arrival Day and Day 1 (10 October 2011)
Location: Monaco (Paris pick up point)
Morning Activity: 
Afternoon Activity:

Day 2 (11 October 2011)
Location: Isola
Morning Activity: Snowboarding
Afternoon Activity:

Day 3 (12 October 2011)
Location: Cannes
Morning Activity: 
Afternoon Activity:

Day 4 (13 October 2011)
Location: Hyères
Morning Activity: Sea kayaking
Afternoon Activity: Zoo trip

Day 5 (14 October 2011)
Location: Ajaccio
Morning Activity: Horse riding
Afternoon Activity:

Day 6 (17 October 2011)
Location: Corte
Morning Activity: White-water rafting
Afternoon Activity: Ravine zip-wiring

Day 7 (18 October 2011)
Location: Livorno
Morning Activity: 
Afternoon Activity:

Day 8 (19 October 2011)
Location: Florence
Morning Activity: 
Afternoon Activity:

Day 9 (20 October 2011)
Location: Verona
Morning Activity: Juliet's balcony
Afternoon Activity: Opera lesson

Day 10 and The Last Day (21 October 2011)
Location: Orvieto
Morning Activity: Pizza making
Afternoon Activity: Segway tour around Rome

References

2011 British television seasons
Coach Trip series